Łebień refers to the following places in Poland:

 Łebień, Lębork County
 Łebień, Słupsk County